The Folkerts Henderson Highwing is an American single place homebuilt aircraft developed by air-racer Clayton Folkerts.

Design and development
The Folkerts Henderson Highwing is a single place, open cockpit, high-wing light aircraft powered by a Henderson-B4 engine. The aircraft features all-wood construction

Operational history
Clayton Folkerts completed the aircraft in 1928 and flew it until 1932. It was then stored until 1965 when it was presented to the EAA Museum at Oshkosh, Wisconsin. After restoration, it has been exhibited in the Pioneer Village section of the museum site.

Specifications (Highwing)

References

Homebuilt aircraft